Carlos Peralta is a Mexican businessman and baseball team owner.

After inheriting the construction business from his father Alejo Peralta, he expanded it into electronics. In 2001, he sold the company's stake in Iusacell to Vodafone for $973 million. He has since invested in luxury real estate and hydroponic tomato growing.

He owns the Tigres de Quintana Roo.

Personal
Married, he has six children. He is the father of Olivia Peralta, and the grandfather of Loreto Peralta, a child actress known for her part in Instructions Not Included.

References

Year of birth missing (living people)
Living people
Mexican businesspeople
Baseball executives